The Dive is a 1990 Norwegian action thriller directed by Tristan de Vere Cole, starring Bjørn Sundquist, Frank Grimes and Michael Kitchen. The movie tells the story of a couple of two deep sea divers and a risky operation at 110 meters.

References

External links
 
 
 Dykket at the Norwegian Film Institute 

1990 films
1990 drama films
1990 action thriller films
Norwegian action thriller films
1990s Norwegian-language films